Harker Heights High School is a 6A public high school located in Harker Heights, Texas, United States. It is one of five high schools in the Killeen Independent School District located in western Bell County and serves students in Harker Heights along with parts of Killeen. In 2011, the school was rated "Academically Acceptable" by the Texas Education Agency.

Athletics
The Harker Heights Knights compete in the following sports:

Baseball
Basketball
Cross Country
Football
Golf
Powerlifting
Soccer
Softball
Swimming
Tennis
Track and Field
Volleyball
Wrestling

Notable alumni
Dominique Zeigler - Former Baylor University and San Francisco 49ers Wide Receiver.
Isaac Murphy - Former University of Texas at Austin two time All-Big 12 Track and Field heptathlete.
Kyle Thompson -Former University of Texas at Austin seven time All-Big 12 Track and Field Athlete.
Dalenta Stephens - Professional basketball player who played for the Milwaukee Bucks and the Memphis Grizzlies.

References

External links
Killeen ISD

High schools in Bell County, Texas
Killeen Independent School District high schools